Mauro Cerioni (born 3 August 1948) is a retired Italian basketball player. He was part of the Italian team that finished fourth at the 1972 Summer Olympics.

References

1948 births
Living people
Olympic basketball players of Italy
People from the Province of Piacenza
Basketball players at the 1972 Summer Olympics
Dinamo Sassari coaches
Sportspeople from the Province of Piacenza